Platystoma seminationis, the dancing "kiss fly", is a species of fly in the family Platystomatidae, meaning big mouths.

Subspecies
Subspecies include: 
 Platystoma seminationis angustipenne Loew, 1854
 Platystoma seminationis bisetum Loew, 1868
 Platystoma seminationis frauenfeldi Nowicki, 1867
 Platystoma seminationis rufimanum Loew, 1873
 Platystoma seminationis seminationis (Fabricius, 1775)

Distribution
This species is present in most of Europe (Austria, Belgium, United Kingdom, Russia, Czech Republic, Denmark, Finland, Germany, Hungary, Italy, Poland, Romania, Slovakia, Spain, Switzerland, Netherlands and Ukraine) and in the Near East.  It is adventive in North America.

Habitat
These flies inhabit forest fringes or hedges, primarily on low herbaceous vegetation  in shady places.

Description
In these flies the interocular space and the epistomes are black and the eyes are  reddish-brown. Thorax is greyish. The wings are  translucent, greyish brown, with light spots. The abdomen is black, without punctuation. Tarsi are monochromatic black. The largest tarsal segments are reddish near the base, or show reddish hairs on lower side. Moreover halteres have a blackish brown club.

Biology
Adults can be found from May to October.  They mainly feed on nectar and pollen of the cypress spurge (Euphorbia cyparissias), green spurge (Euphorbia esula) and other  Euphorbiaceae, as well as on feces. Larvae develop in and feed on decaying vegetable material,  on mushrooms and on roots of mushroom-infected plants and are probably saprophages. 

These flies have a highly developed ritual of courtship, during which after a dance of rapprochement the male and female "kiss" each other, touching together with their large proboscis for 5-15 seconds.

Gallery

References

Joachim und Hiroko Haupt: Fliegen und Mücken: Beobachtung, Lebensweise. Naturbuch-Verlag, Augsburg 1998, .

External links
Images representing Platystoma seminationis at BOLD

Platystomatidae
Insects described in 1775
Muscomorph flies of Europe
Taxa named by Johan Christian Fabricius